Lekhtusi Radar Station  is an early warning radar near Lekhtusi in Leningrad Oblast, Russia. It is a key part of the Russian early warning system against missile attack, going on combat duty on 11 February 2012. It is run by the Russian Aerospace Defence Forces.

There have been a number of announcements about the introduction of this radar, the first one of the third generation Voronezh series of early warning radar. It first entered testing in December 2005, experimental service a year later, service in December 2009 and finally combat duty in 2012.

It is adjacent to the A.F. Mozhaysky Military-Space Academy which is an officer training centre for the Aerospace Defence Forces.

Voronezh radar

Voronezh radar are highly prefabricated radars needing fewer personnel and using less energy than previous generations. The radar was described by Space Forces commander Oleg Ostapenko as covering north west Russia and replacing coverage lost when the radar at Skrunda in Latvia was decommissioned in 1998.

References

Russian Space Forces
Russian and Soviet military radars
Military installations of Russia